The Apis mellifera jemenitica (Arabian or Nubian Honey Bee) is a subspecies of the western honey bee. It is native to the southern Arabian Peninsula, south of the Sahara, Sudan and Somalia. Based on morphological studies by Friedrich Ruttner, it is classified as a tropical African bee group.

Description
Apis mellifera jemenitica is quite small and stocky of shape. The color of the abdomen of the workers shows one to three yellow rings, the yellow coloration is alternately extended. Apis mellifera jemenitica is adapted to the extreme domestic temperatures and forms relatively small colonies.

See also
Subspecies of Apis mellifera

References

mellifera jemenitica
Insects of Africa
Insects described in 1976
Subspecies